A drudge is a person who does tedious, menial, or unpleasant work; it can also refer to the work itself, known as drudgery.

Drudge can also refer to:

 Matt Drudge, American Internet journalist
 Drudge (TV series), Matt Drudge's former TV series
 Drudge Report, news aggregator run by Matt Drudge
 John Drudge, early 18th century sea captain who ended the career of pirate Nicholas Brown
 Mr. Drudge, a character in the comic strip Motley's Crew
 A race in the MMORPGs Asheron's Call and Asheron's Call 2, playable in the latter
 A race of enemies in the first-person shooter video game The Conduit

See also
 Dredge (disambiguation)